The El Monte Union High School District (EMUHSD) is a public high school district headquartered in El Monte, California. The district employs 623 certificated employees and 625 classified employees. The professional staff provides educational programs for over 10,000 students in grades 9 through 12. It serves the cities of El Monte, South El Monte, the unincorporated community of North El Monte, the northern portion of Rosemead, and the southeastern portion of Temple City. Population studies show that approximately 200,000 people reside within the district's attendance boundaries. It includes 5 comprehensive high schools, a continuation high school, and an adult school.

Board of Trustees

Starting with the November 2022 election, Board members are elected by geographical district with the population numbers released after the 2020 US Census. Prior to the change, voters elected the board members at-large. District 3, 4 and 5 are elected starting with the November 2022 election, while District 1 and 2 are elected starting with the November 2024 election.

Schools

Comprehensive High Schools

El Monte High School (El Monte, California, Opened in 1901)
Rosemead High School (Rosemead, California, Opened in 1949)
Arroyo High School (El Monte, California, Opened in 1955)
Mountain View High School (El Monte, California, Opened in 1971)
South El Monte High School (South El Monte, California, Opened in 1992)

Other Schools
Fernando R. Ledesma High School (Formerly known as Valle Lindo Continuation School)
El Monte Union Community Day School
El Monte-Rosemead Adult School

Feeder districts
El Monte City School District
Mountain View School District
Rosemead School District
Valle Lindo Elementary School District

References

External links

 El Monte Union High School District website

School districts in Los Angeles County, California
El Monte, California
1901 establishments in California